Winter of Frozen Dreams is a 2009 independent American crime drama film directed by Eric Mandelbaum, and starring Thora Birch, Keith Carradine, and Brendan Sexton III. The film follows the story of Barbara Hoffman, a Wisconsin biochemistry student and prostitute convicted of murder in the first televised murder trial ever.

Cast
Thora Birch as Barbara Hoffman
Dan Moran as Harry Berge
Brendan Sexton III as Jerry Davies
Dean Winters as Ken Curtis
Keith Carradine as detective Lulling
Colleen Camp as Jerry's mother
William Swan as judge

Controversy over sex scene
A controversy during filming involving Birch's father and his forced presence during Birch's taping of a sex scene for the movie made tabloid headlines.

Reception
Released on DVD on March 31, 2009, Winter of Frozen Dreams got reviewed by DVD Talk who stated that "[the film] suffers from that most severe of cinematic situations. It wastes opportunities and does its real life saga no favors".

John Marrone of Bloody Disgusting wrote "While it sure is watchable and no less worse than the prime time crap you find on the three TV major stations during the week, it leaves you very confused".

References

External links

2009 crime drama films
American crime drama films
2000s English-language films
2000s American films